Biology Battle is a multidirectional shooter for the Xbox 360 and Microsoft Windows. It is a dual-stick shooter with elements similar to Robotron: 2084, Smash TV, and Geometry Wars.

Development
According to an interview with Novaleaf Game Studios, the game cost US$100,000  to make, higher than other XBLIG games.

The game was written using C# and XNA.

Reception

Biology Battle received mixed reviews upon release. On Metacritic, the Xbox 360 version of the game holds a score of 69/100 based on 13 reviews, indicating "mixed or average reviews". On GameRankings, the Xbox 360 version of the game holds a score of 71.25% based on 12 reviews.

References

External links 
Official Biology Battle website
Biology Battle at Xbox.com

2008 video games
Microsoft games
Multidirectional shooters
Video games developed in Thailand
Windows games
Xbox 360 games
Xbox 360 Live Indie games
Multiplayer and single-player video games